Muhammad Alif Safwan bin Mohd Sallahuddin (born 12 February 2000) is a Malaysian footballer who plays as a forward.

Before UiTM, Alif has played for PKNP F.C. and Kuala Lumpur City F.C..

Honour

Club
Kuala Lumpur City FC
 Malaysia Cup: 2021

References

External links
 

2000 births
Living people
People from Kelantan
Malaysian footballers
Malaysia Super League players
PKNP FC players
Kuala Lumpur City F.C. players
UiTM FC players
Association football forwards